Leon H. "Bud" Carson (April 28, 1930 – December 7, 2005) was an American football player and coach.  He served as the head football coach at the Georgia Institute of Technology from 1967 to 1971, compiling a record of 27–27.  Carson then coached in the National Football League (NFL), mostly as a defensive coordinator.  He was a member of two Super Bowl-winning teams with the Pittsburgh Steelers and one losing team with the LA Rams in the 1970s.  Carson served as the head coach of the Cleveland Browns from 1989 until he was fired midway through the 1990 season. He is credited with developing the Steel Curtain.

Player
Carson played defensive back for North Carolina from 1949 to 1951, then entered the Marines.

Coach
His first coaching job was at Scottdale High School in Southwestern Pennsylvania which he began in 1955.

Georgia Tech
After his discharge from the Marines, he went into coaching, working at Georgia Tech under head coach Bobby Dodd. Carson took over as head coach in 1967. Under Carson, the Yellow Jackets endured three straight 4–6 seasons before going 9–3 and winning the Sun Bowl in 1970. In 1971, Tech finished 6–6 after a Peach Bowl loss.  His dismissal as Head Coach of the Yellow Jackets by James E. Boyd was reported in the Atlanta Constitution under the headline "Bitter Bud Carson Is Ousted at Tech".

In 1970 the GT Band began playing the Budweiser tune after the end of the 3rd quarter.  In tribute to the then head coach the words were actually sung as, "When you say Bud Carson, you've said it all!"

NFL
Pittsburgh Steelers head coach Chuck Noll hired Carson as defensive backs coach in 1972. He was elevated to defensive coordinator in 1973. Under Carson, the "Steel Curtain" developed as one of the best defenses in National Football League history. In Pittsburgh's Super Bowl seasons of 1974 and 1975, this unit, led by Jack Lambert, Mel Blount, Jack Ham and Mean Joe Greene, gave up fewer points than any other American Football Conference team.  In 1976, the "Steel Curtain" allowed fewer than 10 points per game.

After the 1977 season, Carson was hired as defensive coordinator for the Los Angeles Rams, and in 1979, helped guide them to Super Bowl XIV (against his former team, the Steelers). He later served on the coaching staffs of the Kansas City Chiefs and Baltimore Colts before running the New York Jets' defense from 1985 to 1988. He finally landed a head-coaching job with the Cleveland Browns in 1989, replacing Marty Schottenheimer, who was fired after a wild card playoff loss to the Houston Oilers in 1988.

Cleveland won the AFC Central Division in 1989; however, for the third time in four years, the Browns lost to John Elway's Denver Broncos in the conference championship game, 37–21. Browns owner Art Modell fired Carson halfway through the 1990 season, following a 42–0 home loss to the eventual 1990 AFC Champion Buffalo Bills.  Browns' offensive coordinator Jim Shofner became head coach and the Browns finished the season with a 3–13 record.  Save for a 13–10 win over the Atlanta Falcons, the Browns were outscored 217–87, including being shut out 35–0 by the Pittsburgh Steelers and losing 58–14 to the rival Houston Oilers. In the AFC Central Division rival games, the Browns won on opening day against the Steelers, 13–3. They  lost their remaining five AFC Central games however, being outscored by a total of 183–64. Carson's immediate predecessor, Marty Schottenheimer, led his Kansas City Chiefs to an 11–5 won-loss record and a wild card playoff appearance. The Chiefs defeated the Browns 34–0 in Week Four.  Carson returned for successful stints as the defensive coordinator for the Philadelphia Eagles (the 1991 Eagles' defense accomplished the rare feat of being ranked No. 1 versus the pass, #1 versus the rush, and #1 overall) and Rams — by then in St. Louis — before retiring in 1997, due to health concerns.

Family
Carson, a former smoker, died in 2005 of emphysema. He was married to Linda Carson, an anchorwoman at WDAF in Kansas City, and Sarasota television station WWSB. His daughter Cathi Carson worked as the sports reporter at two Jacksonville stations in Jacksonville WJAX-TV and WFOX-TV and was formerly a reporter at WWSB before later becoming a lawyer. He also had a son, Cliff, and another daughter, Dana, as well as a stepson, Donald. His brother, Gib Carson, is currently owner of Gib Carson Associates, which specializes in manufactured gifts.

Head coaching record

College

NFL

References

Further reading
 Grossi, Tony (2004). Tales from the Browns Sideline. (Champaign, Ill.): Sports Publishing LLC. 
 Carroll, Bob, et al. (1999). Total Football II. New York: HarperCollins. .

1930 births
2005 deaths
American football safeties
Cleveland Browns head coaches
Los Angeles Rams coaches
Pittsburgh Steelers coaches
Georgia Tech Yellow Jackets football coaches
North Carolina Tar Heels football coaches
North Carolina Tar Heels football players
People from Brackenridge, Pennsylvania
Players of American football from Pennsylvania
Deaths from emphysema
National Football League defensive coordinators